Phyllonorycter pumilae is a moth of the family Gracillariidae. It is known from the Russian Far East, Japan and north-western China.

The larvae feed on Ulmus pumila. They probably mine the leaves of their host plant.

References

pumilae
Moths of Asia
Moths described in 1981